Pirivom Santhippom (season 2)  is an Indian Tamil-language soap opera that aired Monday through Friday on STAR Vijay from 12 November 2012 to 11 January 2013 at 7:00PM IST for 41 episodes. Due to bad ratings and feedback, STAR Vijay had ended the serial.

The show starred Kalyani, Rachitha Mahalakshmi, Syed Anwar Ahmed and among others. It was director by Rashool. It revolves around sisters and best friends, Jothi (Kalyani) and Revathy (Rachitha Mahalakshmi) who love each other.

Plot
The story Jothi (Rachitha Mahalakshmi) as a widow who is angry with Revathy (Kalyani) and Revathy who badly wants to break the wall between her and Jothi. Jothi wants to punish the people who have caused her husband's death and promises to show no mercy to them when found.

Cast
 Kalyani as Revathy
 Rachitha Mahalakshmi as Jothi
 Syed Anwar Ahmed as Prabhu
 Mohammed Azeem as Karthi
 Rajyalakshmi

References

External links
Official website
Star Vijay on Youtube
Star Vijay US
Star Vijay Malaysia

2013 Tamil-language television seasons